The seventh season of Chicago Med, an American medical drama television series with executive producer Dick Wolf, and producers Michael Brandt, Derek Haas, Peter Jankowski, Andrew Schneider and Diane Frolov, was ordered on February 27, 2020. The season premiered on September 22, 2021.

Cast

Main characters
 Nick Gehlfuss as Dr. Will Halstead, Supervising Attending Emergency Physician
 Torrey DeVitto as Dr. Natalie Manning (episode 1)
 Brian Tee as LCDR Dr. Ethan Choi, Attending Emergency Physician/Chief of the ED.
 Marlyne Barrett as Maggie Campbell, RN, ED Charge Nurse
 S. Epatha Merkerson as Sharon Goodwin, Chief of Patient and Medical Services
 Oliver Platt as Dr. Daniel Charles, Chief of Psychiatry
 Dominic Rains as Dr. Crockett Marcel, Trauma Surgeon
 Guy Lockard as  Dr. Dylan Scott, Emergency Medicine/Pediatrics Resident 
 Kristen Hager as Dr. Stevie Hammer, Emergency Attending Physician (episodes 1-14)
 Steven Weber as Dr. Dean Archer, Interim Chief of The ED
 Jessy Schram as Dr. Hannah Asher (episode 16-onwards)

Recurring characters
 Michael Rady as Dr. Matt Cooper
 Sarah Rafferty as Dr. Pamela Blake, Transplant surgeon
 Asjha Cooper as Dr. Vanessa Taylor, Emergency Medicine Resident
 Brennan Brown as Dr. Sam Abrams, Attending Neurosurgeon 
 Lorena Diaz as Emergency Department Nurse Doris
 Marie Tredway as Emergency Department Nurse Trinidad “Trini” Campos 
 Marc Grapey as Peter Kalmick
 Johanna Braddy as Avery Quinn
 Riley Voelkel as Milena Jovanovic

Crossover characters
 LaRoyce Hawkins as Officer Kevin Atwater
 Marina Squerciati as Officer Kim Burgess
Randy Flagler as Firefighter Harold Capp
Anthony Ferraris as Firefighter Tony Ferraris

Episodes

Production

Filming
Filming for season 7 started on July 20, 2021

Casting
On May 12, 2021, Yaya DaCosta and Torrey Devitto announced their departure from the series. On July 21, 2021, it was announced that Steven Weber would be promoted to a series regular after recurring in the sixth season, and Guy Lockard and Kristen Hager would join the main cast. On March 16, 2022, it was announced that Jessy Schram, who previously recurred as Dr. Hannah Asher had been promoted to series regular as of episode 16 of the seventh season. On April 4, 2022, it was announced that Kristen Hager exited the series.

Ratings

References

External links

2021 American television seasons
2022 American television seasons
Chicago Med seasons